is a 1936 Japanese comedy-drama film written and directed by Hiroshi Shimizu. It is based on a short story by Nobel Prize-winning novelist Yasunari Kawabata, and noted for its portrayal of depression-era Japan and its location shooting.

Plot
A bus driver, nicknamed Mr. Thank You due to his expressions of gratitude to other road users who give way on the narrow mountain roads, drives from rural Izu to faraway Tokyo. The film portrays the passengers and their diverse reasons for travel, like a mother and her daughter who is destined to be sold in Tokyo, and the people they meet on the way, including a Korean working woman who makes funeral arrangements for her deceased father. In the end, Mr. Thank You marries the daughter to save her from her fate.

Cast
 Ken Uehara as Mr. Thank You (Arigatô-san)
 Ryuji Ishiyama as Gentleman with beard
 Einosuke Naka as Peddler
 Michiko Kuwano	
 Mayumi Tsukiji
 Kaoru Futaba 
 Reikichi Kawamura as Villager from Tokyo
 Setsuko Shinobu 
 Kazuji Sakai as Peddler
 Nagamasa Yamada as Peddler

Literary source
Mr. Thank You is based on Yasunari Kawabata's 1925 short story Thank You (Arigatō), which itself is part of his Palm-of-the-Hand Stories cycle. In Kawabata's original story, the only passengers portrayed are the mother and daughter, who are driving to a harbour town 35 miles north, where the girl will be sold to a man she has never met. The mother begs the driver to take care for her daughter, who seems to find him sympathetic. After an argument in the lodging house, where the trio stayed overnight, the driver reluctantly agrees to take the girl with him, but only for the cold season.

References

External links
 
 
 

1936 films
1936 comedy-drama films
Films based on short fiction
Japanese comedy-drama films
Japanese black-and-white films
Films based on works by Yasunari Kawabata
Films directed by Hiroshi Shimizu
Films with screenplays by Hiroshi Shimizu
Great Depression films
Films set in the 1930s